Xylorhiza orcuttii is a perennial plant in the family Asteraceae known by the common name Orcutt's aster. It is native to southern California and northern Baja California, where it grows in scrubby habitat in the dry canyons of the Sonoran Desert. It often grows in rocky and sandy substrates, clay, and alkaline soils amongst cactus. It is a shrub with branching, mostly hairless stems that may reach 1.5 meters in length. The leaves are lance-shaped to oblong with smooth, toothed, or spiny edges. The inflorescence is a solitary flower head with up to 40 or more lavender or pale blue ray florets, each of which may measure over 3 centimeters in length. Flowering may begin as early as late fall or winter. The fruit is an achene which may be over a centimeter long, including its pappus of bristles.

References

External links
Jepson Manual eFlora (TJM2) treatment of Xylorhiza orcuttii
USDA Plants Profile for Xylorhiza orcuttii
UC Photos gallery of Xylorhiza orcuttii

Astereae
Flora of the California desert regions
Flora of Baja California
Flora of the Sonoran Deserts
Natural history of the Colorado Desert
Taxa named by Edward Lee Greene
Flora without expected TNC conservation status